The 2013 National Club Baseball Association (NCBA) Division I World Series was played at University of Tampa Baseball Stadium in Tampa, FL from May 24 to May 30. The thirteenth tournament's champion was Penn State University. The Most Valuable Player was Kyle Gilbert of Penn State University.

Format
The format is similar to the NCAA College World Series in that eight teams participate in two four-team double elimination brackets with the exception of a one-game national championship rather than a best-of-3 format to determine the national champion like the NCAA. Beginning with the 2013 edition of the NCBA Division I World Series, the losers of Games 7 and 8 were sent to the other half of the bracket in addition to the losers of Games 1-4.

Participants
All records are pre-World Series games

Results

Bracket

Game Results

Championship Game

See also
2013 NCBA Division I Tournament
2013 NCBA Division II World Series
2013 NCBA Division II Tournament

References

2013 in baseball
Baseball competitions in Florida
National Club Baseball Association
NCBA Division I
Sports competitions in Tampa, Florida